Notable people with the name Ailsa include:

Ailsa Berk, British actress and choreographer
Ailsa Mellon Bruce (1901–1969), American socialite
Ailsa Carmichael, Lady Carmichael, Scottish judge
Ailsa Chang, American journalist for NPR
Ailsa McGown Clark (1926–2014), British zoologist
Ailsa Craig (journalist) (1917–2012), Australian journalist
Ailsa Garland (1917–1982), British fashion journalist and editor
Ailsa Hughes (born 1991), Irish rugby player
Ailsa Keating, French-British mathematician
Ailsa Land (1927–2021), English professor
Ailsa Lister (born 2004), Scottish cricketer
Ailsa Mainman, British archaeologist and pottery specialist
Ailsa Maxwell (1922–2020), British code breaker and historian
Ailsa McGilvary, New Zealand bird conservationist and photographer
Ailsa McKay (1963–2014), Scottish economist
Ailsa O'Connor (1921–1980), Australian artist and sculptor
Ailsa Piper (born 1959), Australian actress and writer
Ailsa A. Welch (born 1956), British scientist

See also
Marquess of Ailsa, title in the Peerage of the United Kingdom created in 1831

Feminine given names